The 1950 Titleholders Championship was contested from March 16–19 at Augusta Country Club. It was the 11th edition of the Titleholders Championship.

This event was won by Babe Zaharias.

Final leaderboard

External links
Youngstown Vindicator source
The Spokesman-Review source

Titleholders Championship
Golf in Georgia (U.S. state)
Titleholders Championship
Titleholders Championship
Titleholders Championship
Titleholders Championship
Women's sports in Georgia (U.S. state)